Ilka Jane White is an Australian artist. Her practice spans projects in textiles, drawing, sculpture and installation, art-in-community and cross disciplinary collaboration. Direct engagement with the natural world is central to White’s making process. Her current work explores relationships between the mind, body, time and place, and questions the separation of these elements.

Early life and education
White was born in  Ivanhoe, Melbourne and grew up in the rural Victorian town of Maryborough, Shire of Central Goldfields with a steady stream of musicians, artists and makers dropping into the family home. White went on to study fashion design so she could become a costume designer and maker for the theatre. After a few years working with costumes, White studied weaving and attained an Associate Diploma in Studio Textiles from Melbourne Institute of Textiles – now RMIT University. In 2008 White completed her Bachelor of Fine Arts (Tapestry) from Monash University in Melbourne. Between 1999 and 2011 White taught on art and textiles at RMIT and was the teaching artist in residence at the Australian National University School of Art in 2012.

Exhibitions

 Whitework: A Contemporary Trousseau, Craft Victoria Gallery, Melbourne, Australia, April 2004
 In the World: (head, hand, heart), 17th Tamworth Fibre Textile Biennial, National tour, Australia, 2006
 WALK, Portland Arts Centre, Portland, Victoria and National Tour, Australia, 2006-2009
 Drawing Out, First Site Gallery, RMIT and Big Screen, Federation Square, Melbourne, Australia, 2010
 Life in Your Hands: (Art from Solastalgia), Lake Macquarie City Art Gallery, National Tour, Australia, 2012
 Material Culture''', Counihan Gallery, Brunswick, Australia, 2012
 Petite: Miniature Textiles, Exhibitions Gallery, Wangaratta, Australia, 2012
 Spinifex Country, Flinders University City Gallery, Adelaide, Australia, 2013
 TIME, Poimena Art Gallery, Launceston, Australia, 2013
 Contemporary Textiles, Exhibitions Gallery, Wangaratta, Australia, 2013
 GhostNets Fish, Martin Browne Contemporary, Paddington, Australia, 2014
 Partnership, Lot19, Castlemaine, Australia, 2014
 Artists for the Tarkine, Brightspace, St Kilda, Australia, 2014
 Walking the Merri, RMIT Project Space, Carlton, Australia, 2014
 Group Exchange'', 2nd Tamworth Fibre Textile Triennial, National tour 2014-2016

See also
Australian art

References

Living people
Australian textile artists
Australian women artists
Monash University alumni
RMIT University alumni
Academic staff of RMIT University
Women textile artists
Year of birth missing (living people)
People from Maryborough, Victoria